O Salnés is a comarca in the Galician Province of Pontevedra. It covers an area of 275.2 km2, and had an overall population of 114,600 at the 2011 Census; the latest official estimate (as at the start of 2018) was 113,052.

Municipalities
The camarca is composed of the following 10 municipalities:

References

Comarcas of the Province of Pontevedra